Haemodorum gracile is a plant in the Haemodoraceae (blood root) family, native to Western Australia, and was first described by Terry Desmond Macfarlane in 1987.

Its red/brown flowers are seen from August to November.

References

gracile
Flora of Western Australia
Taxa named by Terry Desmond Macfarlane
Plants described in 1987